

213001–213100 

|-bgcolor=#f2f2f2
| colspan=4 align=center | 
|}

213101–213200 

|-bgcolor=#f2f2f2
| colspan=4 align=center | 
|}

213201–213300 

|-id=255
| 213255 Kimiyayui ||  || Enthusiastic amateur astronomer Kimiya Yui (born 1970) was selected to be an astronaut candidate by Japan Aerospace Exploration Agency in 2009, and was certified as an International Space Station (ISS) astronaut in 2011. On July 22, 2015, he flew to ISS and stayed in space for 141 days. || 
|-id=269
| 213269 Angelbarbero ||  || Angel Barbero Peregrina (born 1972) worked from 2004 until 2014 as a chef at the Spanish Calar Alto Observatory. Through his culinary skills he contributed significantly to the well-being of his colleagues, visiting astronomers, and the discoverers of this asteroid. He and his food are dearly missed. || 
|}

213301–213400 

|-bgcolor=#f2f2f2
| colspan=4 align=center | 
|}

213401–213500 

|-bgcolor=#f2f2f2
| colspan=4 align=center | 
|}

213501–213600 

|-bgcolor=#f2f2f2
| colspan=4 align=center | 
|}

213601–213700 

|-id=629
| 213629 Binford ||  || Lewis Binford (1931–2011), American archaeologist and anthropologist. || 
|-id=636
| 213636 Gajdoš ||  || Štefan Gajdoš (born 1959), Slovak astronomer, discoverer of minor planets, and lecturer at the Comenius University in Bratislava || 
|-id=637
| 213637 Lemarchal ||  || Grégory Lemarchal (1983–2007), a French pop-rock singer. He won the French version of Star Academy TV show and became very popular afterward. In 2006 he was honored as "breakthrough artist of the year" at the NRJ Music Awards. The asteroid's name was suggested by Slovak amateur astronomer Stefan Kürti and officially named by the MPC on 23 September 2010. || 
|}

213701–213800 

|-id=770
| 213770 Fignon ||  || Laurent Fignon (1960–2010), a famous French professional road bicycle racer. || 
|-id=771
| 213771 Johndee ||  || John Dee (c. 1527–1609), English mathematician, astronomer, and navigation expert || 
|-id=772
| 213772 Blaheta ||  || Radim Blaheta (born 1951), a professor in applied mathematics at the University of Ostrava in the Czech Republic, whose research includes mathematical modeling in Earth science and climate engineering. || 
|-id=775
| 213775 Zdeněkdostál ||  || Zdeněk Dostál (born 1946), a professor in applied mathematics at the University of Ostrava in the Czech Republic, developing "algorithms for quadratic programming problems" and "scalable domain decomposition". || 
|-id=800
| 213800 Stefanwul || 2003 GO || Stefan Wul (1922–2003), pen name of French science-fiction writer Pierre Pairault. || 
|}

213801–213900 

|-bgcolor=#f2f2f2
| colspan=4 align=center | 
|}

213901–214000 

|-bgcolor=#f2f2f2
| colspan=4 align=center | 
|}

References 

213001-214000